Liliyana Natsir (born 9 September 1985) is an Indonesian former badminton player who specialized in doubles. She is one of the standout front court player, with dexterousness and skill in controlling and executing the shuttlecock. Natsir has tremendous record over more than two decade by winning a gold and a silver from the Olympic Games, and four gold medals at the BWF World Championships. Her achievements are recognized worldwide, and was inducted in the BWF Hall of Fame in 2022.

Natsir was ranked world number 1 in the mixed doubles with two different partner. Together with Nova Widianto, she won the gold medal at the 2005 and 2007 World Championships; 2006 World Cup; 2006 Asian Championships; and a silver medal at the 2008 Beijing Olympics. Natsir was then paired with Tontowi Ahmad and the two quickly established a strong partnership. The duo clinched the BWF World Championships title in 2013 and 2017; won the 2015 Asian Championships; and also the gold medal at the 2016 Rio Olympics. Natsir and Ahmad topped the mixed doubles world ranking on 3 May 2018.

Natsir was the second Indonesian woman Olympic gold medalist, after Susi Susanti in 1992, and is later succeeded by Greysia Polii and Apriyani Rahayu in 2021. Among her achievements is her three back-to-back titles from the 2012–2014 All England Open; and in 2016, she and Ahmad became the first Indonesian mixed doubles pair to win a gold medal at the Olympics. She holds the highest number of BWF World Championship titles for mixed doubles.

Early life 
Natsir had dreamed of being a badminton athlete since childhood. She started playing badminton at the age of nine at her local badminton club, PB Pisok, in Manado. Three years later, she decided to move to Jakarta and entered her youth club, Tangkas Alfamart. She joined the national badminton team of Indonesia in 2002 together with Natalia Christine Poluakan, her longtime friend from Manado. When she and Poluakan won the women's doubles title in Pekan Olahraga Nasional (National Games), Richard Mainaky noticed her game and invited her to play in mixed doubles with Nova Widianto.

Career

2000–2002: Early career, Asian Junior champion 
As a Tangkas player, Natsir started to rose in the women's doubles when she and her partner Natalia Christine Poluakan won some several national tournaments in 2000. She first entered the international stage at the 2001 Asian Junior Championships in Taipei Taiwan, where she and her teammates won the bronze medal in the girls' team event. She played at her first Indonesia Open with Poluakan, but the duo was stopped in the first round. Natsir and Poluakan then took the victory at the Indonesian Junior National Championships, led her to join the national training center. Partnered with Markis Kido, she won the mixed doubles title at the 2002 Asian Junior Championships. She also claimed three bronze medals in the mixed team, girls' doubles and mixed doubles at the World Junior Championships.

2003–2005: Southeast Asian gold, World Champion 
In 2003, Natsir focused on playing in the women's doubles. She started her journey in the IBF Grand Prix event with partner Eny Erlangga, but the duo did not gave a satisfactory results since they only finished the tournaments in the early round. Natsir also made her debut at the World Championships with Devi Sukma Wijaya, but was stopped in the second round. In December, Natsir took part at the 2003 Southeast Asian Games in Vietnam, and won a silver in the women's doubles and a bronze in the team event.  From January to October 2004, Natsir competed in the women's doubles with different partners; Poluakan, Erlangga, Rintan Apriliana, and Greysia Polii. She was able to go further when paired with Polii, when the duo finished as quarter-finalist in the Malaysia Open. Natsir then competed in the Pekan Olahraga Nasional, where she and her partner, Poluakan, won a gold medal for their hometown of North Sulawesi. Indonesia mixed doubles coach, Richard Mainaky noticed her talent and invited Natsir to play in the mixed doubles. She then made her debut in the mixed doubles with Nova Widianto and reached the semi-finals in the China Open. A week later, Natsir claimed her first Grand Prix title in the Singapore Open, beating the Malaysian pair Koo Kien Keat and Wong Pei Tty with a landslide score of 15–1 and 15–4.

Natsir encountered half of the 2005 season without any titles. However, Natsir and Widianto contend the international stage by reaching the finals in the Swiss Open; semi-finals in the Korea and All England Opens; and quarter-finals in the Japan, Singapore, and the Malaysia Opens. She also took part in the Sudirman Cup, where Indonesia team finished as finalists against China. In August, Natsir and Widianto secured the gold at the World Championships over China's up and coming Xie Zhongbo  and Zhang Yawen. They ended a 12-year title drought in the mixed doubles and becoming the second Indonesia pair to win the title, after Christian Hadinata and Imelda Wiguno in 1980. A month later, they cliched home soil title, the Indonesia Open. In December, Natsir and Widianto won the gold medal in the Southeast Asian Games, and ended the 2005 season by winning a silver medal in the World Cup.

2006: Asian champions and World Cup title 
In 2006, Natsir and her partner, Widianto won the Asian Championships and three World Grand Prix titles. They started the year as the semi-finalist in the All England Open, lost to last year champion Nathan Robertson and Gail Emms. She played for Indonesia women's team squad in the qualification for the Uber Cup, but the team did not advance to the women's team championships. In April, Natsir claimed her first ever Asian Championships title by defeating Thai pair Sudket Prapakamol and Saralee Thungthongkam in the final. At the Indonesia Open in June, Natsir and Widianto unable to defend their title after lost the match to Xie Zhongbo and Zhang Yawen. A week later, they won their first Grand Prix title of the year in the Singapore Open after defeating Robertson and Emms in a thrilling final. They then went on to win the Chinese Taipei and Korea Opens. Their positive performance stopped by Zheng Bo and Zhao Tingting in the final of the Hong Kong Open.

As the top seeds in the IBF World Championships, Natsir and Widianto suffered a crushing defeat in the third round to Koo Kien Keat and Wong Pei Tty. They then reached the Japan Open finals, but lost to their compatriot Flandy Limpele and Vita Marissa. At the World Cup in Yiyang, China, Natsir and Widianto convert their last year silver to gold medal by avenging the victory against Xie Zhongbo and Zhang Yawen. She competed in the Asian Games in Doha, Qatar, but unable to contribute medals to her country.

2007: Second World Championships title 
Natsir and Widianto partnership started half of the 2007 season without holding any titles. They had reached the final round in the Indonesia Open, but their way to win the title was dashed by Zheng Bo and Gao Ling. She then made her third appearance at the Sudirman Cup, but Indonesia team still unable to lifted the trophy from the defending champion China. While Natsir has been focused on mixed doubles with partner Nova Widianto, she returned to the women's doubles competitive stage with Vita Marissa. Natsir and Marissa debut yielded sweet results, as they won the China Masters. In July, Natsir and Widianto captured their first title of the year in the Philippines Open. They then clinched their second World Championships title beating top seed Zheng Bo and Gao Ling in the final. In September Japan Open, Natsir and her partner were defeated in the second round in the women's doubles and in the final in the mixed doubles both by Gao Ling and her partner. The defeat suffered by Natsir–Widianto at the final of the Japan Open made their head to head record against Gao–Zheng deficit to 2–3. They then managed to win two tournaments in a row, in the China and Hong Kong Opens, where also in Hong Kong, they managed to avenge the defeat to Zheng Bo and Gao Ling. In the Southeast Asian Games in Thailand, Natsir and Marissa won the gold medal in the women's doubles, defeating their Indonesian teammates Jo Novita and Greysia Polii in straight game. They also helped the Indonesian women's team win the team gold medal at the games.

2008–2009: Beijing Olympics and World Championships silver medalists 
Natsir began the 2008 season playing at the Malaysia and Korea Open in January. In the mixed doubles with her partner Widianto, they were stopped in the quarter-finals in Malaysia and in the first round in Korea both by South Korean pair Lee Yong-dae and Lee Hyo jung. Also along with Marissa in the women's doubles, they were beaten in the second round in Malaysia and in the quarter-finals in Korea. On a European tour, Natsir and Widianto reached the final in the All England Open and in the semi-finals in the Swiss Open. Meanwhile in the women's doubles, Natsir and Marissa were stopped in the second round in both tournaments. At the Asian Championships in Johor Bahru, Malaysia, Natsir clinched a silver in the mixed doubles and a bronze in the women's doubles. Together with Indonesia women's team squad, Natsir helped the team reach the final of the Uber Cup. Natsir and her partner, Widianto, won their first title of the year in the Singapore Open. She then won the women's doubles title with Marissa at the Indonesia Open.

Natsir competed in badminton at the 2008 Summer Olympics in mixed doubles with partner Nova Widianto and earned a silver medal. They were defeated in the final by the gold medalists Lee Yong-dae and Lee Hyo-jung of South Korea in straight game 21–11 and 21–17. She also competed in the women's doubles event with Vita Marissa but lost to Yang Wei and Zhang Jiewen of China in the first round. After the Olympics, Natsir and Widianto reached the final in the Japan Open and China Masters. They also finished as semi-finalists in the French Open, and quarter-finalists in the Hong Kong Open. While with Marissa, she reached the semi-finals in the Japan Open; and also in the quarter-finals in the China Masters, French and Hong Kong Opens. Natsir qualified to compete at the Super Series Masters Finals in both mixed and women's doubles. She and her partners progressed to the finals, but losing the match to Chin Eei Hui and Wong Pei Tty of Malaysia in the women's doubles in straight game and also to Thomas Laybourn and Kamilla Rytter Juhl of Denmark in the mixed doubles in a close three games.

Natsir opened the 2009 season by winning the Malaysia Open in the mixed doubles event with Nova Widianto. The duo beating reigning Olympic champion Lee Yong-dae and Lee Hyo-jung in straight game in the final. Her women's doubles partner, Vita Marissa, resigned from the national team in early 2009. When this decision came out, Marissa and Natsir had to split up and each focus on their own careers. They play their last tournament together in the Malaysia Open reaching in to the quarter-finals. Competing as the top seed, Natsir and Widianto had to suffered an early exit in the Korea Open; and later reached the semi-finals in the Singapore Open; and also in the quarter-finals in the All England, Swiss and Indonesia Opens. Throughout half of the 2009 season, they suffered two defeats by Zheng Bo with his new partner Ma Jin in the Swiss and Indonesia Opens. In August, Natsir and Widianto progressed to the final of the World Championships, but was defeated by Thomas Laybourn and Kamilla Rytter Juhl. They then won the title in the French Open, and also finished as finalist in the Hong Kong Open. Natsir then participated in her fourth Southeast Asian Games, winning a gold medal in the mixed doubles with Widianto and a silver in the women's team. Natsir and Widianto ended the 2009 season ranked as world number 2.

2010: Three different partners 
Natsir started the 2010 season in the Malaysia Open with her partner Nova Widianto. Unfortunately, they suffered a shocking defeat in the first round to Ko Sung-hyun and Ha Jung-eun. They were later able to improve their performance by reaching the final in the All England Open. Faced Zhang Nan and Zhao Yunlei, they lost the match in three close games. Natsir tried partnership with Devin Lahardi Fitriawan, which according to national coach, Richard Mainaky, Fitriawan was able to equal Natsir's abilities. Their debut looks quite good, where they are able to reach the semi-finals in the Asian Championships. Back in pairs with Widianto, they then progressed to the Singapore Open final, but was defeated by Thomas Laybourn and Kamilla Rytter Juhl. This was for the third time in a row, they were beaten by this Danish pair. At the home soil Indonesia Open, Natsir and Widianto lost the semi-finals match to Robert Mateusiak and Nadieżda Zięba of Poland. Together with Fitriawan, she won the Malaysia Grand Prix Gold title beating Thai veterans Sudket Prapakamol and Saralee Thungthongkam in the final.

In July 2010, to produce a pair with strong chemistry, Mainaky then tried to pair Natsir with youngster Tontowi Ahmad. Their debut produced positive results as they won the Macau Open, beating Hendra Aprida Gunawan and Vita Marissa in the final. A week later, Natsir and Ahmad lost to Gunawan and Marissa in the final of the Chinese Taipei Open in a close rubber games. Competing as the top seeds in the BWF World Championships, Natsir and Widianto were stopped in the quarter-finals to Zheng Bo and Ma Jin. This was the third consecutive defeat experienced by the pair to Zheng and Ma. In their last two tournaments, Natsir and Widianto were defeated by Chinese pairs Xu Chen and Yu Yang in the quarter-finals of the China Masters and to Zhang Nan and Zhao Yunlei in the second round of the Japan Open. Natsir and Widianto partnership officially split in September 2010. In total, Widianto and Natsir had clinched two World Championship gold medals and 14 titles all together, and were still at world #1 when the decision was announced. In October, Natsir and Ahmad won a Grand Prix Gold title in Samarinda, Indonesia, over an independent pair Markis Kido and Lita Nurlita. Unfortunately, in their debut at the Asian Games, they were beaten by 5th seeds from Chinese Taipei Chen Hung-ling and Cheng Wen-hsing in the second round in straight games.

2011–2012: Fifth Southeast Asian Games gold, World Championships bronze, first All England title, and London Olympics 
Natsir opened the 2011 season with Tontowi Ahmad with unsatisfactory results. They were beaten in the early rounds at the Malaysia Open, in the quarter-finals at the Korea Open, and in the second round at the All England Open. At the Swiss Open, she played in two events. In the mixed doubles with Ahmad, they finished as semi-finalists, while in the women's doubles with Pia Zebadiah Bernadet, they were defeated in the first round. Natsir and Ahmad then increased their performance, by winning three titles in a row, the India Open, Malaysia Grand Prix Gold, and the Singapore Open. After back-to-back titles in May to June they reached a career high as world number 2 in the world, and then able to reach the final at the Indonesia Open losing to current world number 1 Zhang Nan and Zhao Yunlei. The duo also won a bronze medal at the World Championships in London.

In September, Natsir and Ahmad reached the final of the Chinese Taipei Open, lose to Ko Sung-hyun and Eom Hye-won. She competed at the 2011 Southeast Asian Games, won a gold medal in the mixed doubles with Ahmad, and also a silver with Indonesia women's team. Natsir and Ahmad then won the title at the Macau Open, after received a walkover by Chen Hung-ling and Cheng Wen-hsing in the final. The duo then qualified to compete at the World Super Series Finals, but they were eliminated in the group stage. 

Kicked off the 2012 season, Natsir and her partner, Ahmad, unable go further in the Korea and Malaysia Open being stopped in the quarter-finals and semi-finals respectively. In March, Natsir and Ahmad clinched their first All England Open title together, and made this victory as the first ever Indonesia mixed doubles title after 33 years.

Natsir competed in the mixed doubles at the 2012 Summer Olympics with partner Tontowi Ahmad as fourth seed. The duo topped the group C standings without dropping a game. In the quarter-finals, they beat German pair Michael Fuchs and Birgit Michels, but they had to admit the toughness of the second seeds Xu Chen and Ma Jin in the semi-finals. They finally could not present a medal for Indonesia after losing the bronze medal match to Joachim Fischer Nielsen and Christinna Pedersen.

2013: Third World Championships title 
Natsir won the 2013 BWF World Championships in Guangzhou together with her partner Tontowi Ahmad, after beating then-No.1 world ranked Zhang Nan and Zhao Yunlei in the semifinal and the top seed Xu Chen and Ma Jin in the final.

2014: Third All England Open title 
Natsir won the All England Open for three consecutive times from 2012 to 2014. Natsir participated at the 2014 Asian Games in Incheon, South Korea, and won a silver medal in mixed doubles with Ahmad.

2015: Second Asian Championships title 
In 2015, she won a gold medal in the 2015 Asian Championships. In the final, she and Ahmad ousted Lee Chun Hei and Chau Hoi Wah of Hong Kong with a score of 21–16, 21–15, and lead the head-to-head against those pair to 3–0.

2016: Rio Olympics gold medal 
Natsir has made three Olympics appearances. Natsir competed in mixed doubles in 2016 with partner Tontowi Ahmad and won the gold medal in the end.

2017: Fourth World Championships title 
In 2017 BWF World Championships in Glasgow, Natsir and Ahmad again defeated the current world no.1 from China Zheng Siwei and Chen Qingchen to win her fourth World Championships title.

2018: World ranking number 1 with Ahmad 
Natsir and Ahmad achieved the World No. 1 in May 2018.

Awards and nominations

Achievements

Olympic Games 
Mixed doubles

BWF World Championships 
Mixed doubles

World Cup 
Mixed doubles

Asian Games 
Mixed doubles

Asian Championships 
Women's doubles

Mixed doubles

Southeast Asian Games 
Women's doubles

Mixed doubles

World Junior Championships 
Girls' doubles

Mixed doubles

Asian Junior Championships 
Mixed doubles

BWF World Tour (1 title, 3 runners-up) 
The BWF World Tour, which was announced on 19 March 2017 and implemented in 2018, is a series of elite badminton tournaments sanctioned by the Badminton World Federation (BWF). The BWF World Tour is divided into levels of World Tour Finals, Super 1000, Super 750, Super 500, Super 300 (part of the HSBC World Tour), and the BWF Tour Super 100.

Mixed doubles

BWF Superseries (23 titles, 19 runners-up) 

The BWF Superseries, which was launched on 14 December 2006 and implemented in 2007, was a series of elite badminton tournaments, sanctioned by the Badminton World Federation (BWF). BWF Superseries levels were Superseries and Superseries Premier. A season of Superseries consisted of twelve tournaments around the world that had been introduced since 2011. Successful players were invited to the Superseries Finals, which were held at the end of each year.

Natsir has won many Superseries titles with some partners such as Nova Widianto, Vita Marissa, and Tontowi Ahmad.

Women's doubles

Mixed doubles

  BWF Superseries Finals tournament
  BWF Superseries Premier tournament
  BWF Superseries tournament

BWF Grand Prix (15 titles, 8 runners-up) 

The BWF Grand Prix had two levels, the Grand Prix and Grand Prix Gold. It was a series of badminton tournaments sanctioned by the Badminton World Federation (BWF) and played between 2007 and 2017. The World Badminton Grand Prix was sanctioned by the International Badminton Federation from 1983 to 2006.

Women's doubles

Mixed doubles

  BWF Grand Prix Gold tournament
  BWF & IBF Grand Prix tournament

Participation on Indonesian team 
 5 times at Sudirman Cup (2003, 2005, 2007, 2009, 2011, 2013)
 3 times at Uber Cup (2004, 2008, 2010)

Performance timeline

National team 
 Junior level

 Senior level

Individual competitions

Junior level 
In the junior international tournaments, Natsir won a gold in the mixed doubles at the Asian Junior Championships, and two bronze medals in the girls' doubles and mixed doubles at the World Junior Championships.

Girls' doubles

Mixed doubles

Senior level 
<div style="overflow: auto;">
Women's doubles

Mixed doubles

Personal life 
Natsir is a daughter of Beno Natsir (father) and Olly Maramis (mother).

References

Bibliography

External links 

 
 
 

1985 births
Living people
People from Manado
Sportspeople from North Sulawesi
Minahasa people
Indonesian Christians
Indonesian sportspeople of Chinese descent
Indonesian female badminton players
Badminton players at the 2008 Summer Olympics
Badminton players at the 2012 Summer Olympics
Badminton players at the 2016 Summer Olympics
Olympic badminton players of Indonesia
Olympic gold medalists for Indonesia
Olympic silver medalists for Indonesia
Olympic medalists in badminton
Medalists at the 2008 Summer Olympics
Medalists at the 2016 Summer Olympics
Badminton players at the 2006 Asian Games
Badminton players at the 2010 Asian Games
Badminton players at the 2014 Asian Games
Badminton players at the 2018 Asian Games
Asian Games silver medalists for Indonesia
Asian Games bronze medalists for Indonesia
Asian Games medalists in badminton
Medalists at the 2010 Asian Games
Medalists at the 2014 Asian Games
Medalists at the 2018 Asian Games
Competitors at the 2003 Southeast Asian Games
Competitors at the 2005 Southeast Asian Games
Competitors at the 2007 Southeast Asian Games
Competitors at the 2009 Southeast Asian Games
Competitors at the 2011 Southeast Asian Games
Southeast Asian Games gold medalists for Indonesia
Southeast Asian Games silver medalists for Indonesia
Southeast Asian Games bronze medalists for Indonesia
Southeast Asian Games medalists in badminton
World No. 1 badminton players